Lepidogma olivalis is a species of snout moth in the genus Lepidogma. It was described by Charles Swinhoe in 1895, and is known from India (including Mahabaleshwar and Mumbai).

References

Moths described in 1895
Epipaschiinae